Buena Vista is a corregimiento in Colón District, Colón Province, Panama with a population of 14,285 as of 2010. Its population as of 1990 was 7,547; its population as of 2000 was 10,428.

References

Corregimientos of Colón Province